The Cebu North Road, also known as the Cebu North Hagnaya Wharf Road is a , the major thoroughfare that connects the city of Cebu to the Port of Hagnaya in the municipality of San Remigio in Cebu, Philippines.

The road is a component of National Route 8 (N8) and the lone highway of National Route 810 (N810) of the Philippine highway network.

History

Route description

Cebu City to Mandaue 
The road starts at Fuente Osmeña Circle. It starts as General Maxilom Avenue. The avenue ends and continues as Cebu North Road. After reaching the boundary of Cebu and Mandaue, the road assumes its name as Cebu North Hagnaya Wharf Road onwards.

Mandaue to Danao

Danao to San Remigio

Intersections

References 

Roads in Cebu